Pierre Leonardo Ibarra Corral (born 18 January 1983) is a Mexican former football defender who played for the El Paso Coyotes in the Major Arena Soccer League.

Pierre also is brother of Juan de Dios Ibarra, former goalkeeper of CF Monterrey.

References

External links
 

1983 births
Living people
C.F. Monterrey players
Club Necaxa footballers
Murciélagos FC footballers
Lobos BUAP footballers
Correcaminos UAT footballers
Liga MX players
Association football defenders
Sportspeople from Culiacán
Footballers from Sinaloa
Mexican footballers
Major Arena Soccer League players
Expatriate soccer players in the United States
Mexican expatriates in the United States
El Paso Coyotes players